Ricardo Francisco Rojas Trujillo (born 7 May 1974) is a Chilean football manager and former footballer who played as a centre-back. 

He played for clubs like Universidad de Chile, América and Colo-Colo.

Club career
As a youth player, he was with Academia Santa Inés, a traditional Football Academy based in La Serena. Rojas began his professional career in his native country, playing for Club de Deportes La Serena from 1990 to 1993. After his stint at La Serena, he signed with Unión Española. The following year Rojas made his debut with the Chile national team, participating in a game between Chile and Argentina. After his time at Unión, Rojas was transferred to Universidad de Chile during the 1997 season.

Ricardo's continued success at both club and national team levels brought attention to him from foreign teams. At the end of the 2000 season he was signed by the Mexican club Club América. Excluding a six-month loan in 2004 to Universidad Católica de Chile, Rojas has been a staple of the Club América defense for seven years. During his stay in Mexico, Rojas won two championships with his club, in the Verano 2002 season and most recently after the Clausura 2005 tournament. Rojas played more than 200 games with Club América during his time there.

In 2009, he played at Necaxa and then he returned to América.

International career
Fuentes made 42 appearances for Chile from 1994 to 2006. In addition, he played for Chile B against England B on February 10, 1998. Chile won by 2-1.

Managerial career
Rojas began his managerial career as the coach of Unión Compañías in the Tercera B (Chile) until the end of 2019. At the end of 2020, he became the manager of Provincial Ovalle in the Tercera A (Chile).

Personal life
Rojas got a degree in Industrial engineering and also worked as councillor of La Serena from 2013 to 2016 by replacing Mary Yorka Ortiz.

Honours

Club
Universidad de Chile
 Primera División de Chile (2): 1999, 2000
 Copa Chile (2): 1998, 2000

América
 Primera División de México (2): 2002, 2005
 Campeón de Campeones (1): 2005

Colo-Colo
 Primera División de Chile (1): 2008 Clausura

References

External links
 
 

1974 births
Living people
Chilean emigrants to Mexico
Chilean footballers
Chilean Primera División players
Liga MX players
Ascenso MX players
Deportes La Serena footballers
Unión Española footballers
Universidad de Chile footballers
Club América footballers
Club Deportivo Universidad Católica footballers
Colo-Colo footballers
Club Necaxa footballers
C.D. Veracruz footballers
Chilean expatriate footballers
Chile international footballers
1997 Copa América players
2001 Copa América players
Expatriate footballers in Mexico
Chilean expatriate sportspeople in Mexico
Chilean expatriates in Mexico
Association football defenders
People from Vallenar
People from Huasco Province
People from Atacama Region
Chilean sportsperson-politicians
Chilean football managers